Tagetes epapposa  is a Mexican species of plants in the family Asteraceae. It has been found only in the State of Durango in northern Mexico.

Tagetes epapposa is an erect aquatic annual plant up to 35 cm (14 inches) tall. Leaves are long and slender, up to 6 cm (2.4 inches) long. Ray florets are much reduced, yellow, only 1 or 2 per head, each only about 1 mm (0.04 inches) long. Disc florets are also yellow, 6-8 per head. The plant grows in shallow standing water at high elevation (circa 8000 feet or 2400 meters) in the Sierra Madre Occidental.

References

External links
photo of herbarium specimen at Missouri Botanical Garden, collected in Durango in 1962, isotype of Tagetes epapposa 

epapposa
Flora of Durango
Endemic flora of Mexico
Aquatic plants
Plants described in 1988